Peter Oliphant is an American actor and video game designer. He is best known for playing Freddie Helper on the American sitcom television series The Dick Van Dyke Show. Oliphant is currently a video game designer, programmer, and producer. Some games he has worked on include Stonekeep and Lexi-Cross. He worked at Mattel Electronics creating handheld electronic games.

References

External links
 
 Moby Game's entry on Peter Oliphant

Year of birth missing (living people)
Living people
American male child actors
American male television actors
American male film actors
American video game designers
Video game programmers
20th-century American male actors